1,8-Cineole 2-endo-monooxygenase (Formerly , P450cin, CYP176A, CYP176A1) is an enzyme with systematic name 1,8-cineole,NADPH:oxygen oxidoreductase (2-endo-hydroxylating). This enzyme catalyses the following chemical reaction

 1,8-cineole + NADPH + H+ + O2  2-endo-hydroxy-1,8-cineole + NADP+ + H2O

1,8-Cineole 2-endo-monooxygenase is a heme-thiolate protein (P-450).

References

External links 
 

EC 1.14.14